The fifth season of The Great American Baking Show premiered December 12, 2019 on the ABC network. It is the second season under the title The Great American Baking Show: Holiday Edition. Emma Bunton and Anthony "Spice" Adams return as hosts. Returning in the judging panel for their third and second seasons, respectively, are Paul Hollywood and Sherry Yard.

Bakers

Results summary

Color key:

Episodes

Episode 1: Cake
Color key:   

For the signature challenge, the bakers had two hours to make a single-layer olive oil cake. For the technical challenge, Sherry assigned an angel food cake, which the bakers had two and a half hours to complete. For the showstopper, the bakers had three and a half hours to make a chocolate gateau with three layers and chocolate icing.

Episode 2: Bread

For the signature challenge, the bakers had an hour and 45 minutes to make one dozen savory breadsticks. For the technical challenge, set by Paul, the bakers had two and a half hours to make a traditional cob loaf. For the showstopper, the bakers had four and a half hours to make a bread sculpture inspired by "The Twelve Days of Christmas", with at least two flavors of bread.

Episode 3: Spice

The signature challenge was to bake a dozen cinnamon rolls in two and a half hours, including an icing or drizzle. The technical challenge was to bake a dozen Linzer cookies in an hour and a half. For the signature, bakers had five hours to build a holiday gingerbread scene.

Episode 4: Dessert

In the signature challenge, the bakers had an hour and 45 minutes to make madeleines. For the technical, the bakers had to make Queen of Puddings in one hour and 30 minutes. For the showstopper, the bakers had four and a half hours to make a cheesecake tower of at least three tiers, with two of the same flavor and one different.

Episode 5: Pastry

In the signature challenge, the bakers had an hour and 45 minutes to make a citrus tart. For the technical, the bakers had to make hand-raised pies in two hours and 15 minutes. For the showstopper, the bakers had four and a half hours to make Napoleons and palmiers.

Episode 6: Cookie

In the signature challenge, the bakers had two hours and 30 minutes to make winter sugar cookies. For the technical, the bakers had to make fortune cookiess in one hour and 30 minutes. For the showstopper, the bakers had four and a half hours to make macaron tower.

Episode 7: Semi-Finals

In the signature challenge, the bakers had three hours to make two varieties of savory canapés. For the technical, the bakers had to make soufflés in 40 minutes. For the showstopper, the bakers had three and a half hours to make an Opera cake.

Episode 8: Finals

In the signature challenge, the bakers had two hours and 30 minutes to make choux buns. For the technical, the bakers had to make a Fraisier cake in two hours and 30 minutes. For the showstopper, the bakers had three and a half hours to make three different kinds of mini-desserts.

Ratings

References 

The Great American Baking Show
2019 American television seasons
2020 American television seasons